Renzo Miguel Orihuela Barcos (born 4 April 2001) is a Uruguayan professional footballer who plays as a defender for  club Palermo, on loan from Montevideo City Torque.

Club career
Orihuela is a youth academy graduate of Nacional. On 21 February 2020, he joined Montevideo City Torque. He was immediately loaned back to Nacional for two seasons. He made his professional debut for the club on 23 September 2020 in a 3–1 Copa Libertadores win against Venezuelan club Estudiantes de Mérida. He played whole 90 minutes in the match and scored his team's second goal.

On 7 January 2023, Orihuela was formally loaned out to Serie B club Palermo until the end of the season.

International career
Orihuela is a Uruguayan youth international.

Personal life
In addition to his Uruguayan passport, Orihuela has also Italian citizenship through ancestry from his grandfather's side.

Career statistics

Honours
Nacional
Uruguayan Primera División: 2020
Supercopa Uruguaya: 2021

References

External links
 

2001 births
Living people
Footballers from Salto, Uruguay
Association football defenders
Uruguayan footballers
Uruguayan Primera División players
Club Nacional de Football players
Palermo F.C. players
Serie B players